Ussagara is a settlement in the Nguru Mountains region of Morogoro District, Tanzania. Henry Perrott Parker, the second Bishop of Mombasa, died there in May 1888.

Geography of Morogoro Region